The 2017–18 Butler Bulldogs women's basketball team represents Butler University in the 2017–18 NCAA Division I women's basketball season. The Bulldogs, led by fourth year head coach Kurt Godlevske, play their home games at Hinkle Fieldhouse and were members of the Big East Conference. They finished the season 15–17, 6–12 in Big East play to finish in eighth place. They advanced to the quarterfinals of the Big East women's tournament where they lost to Marquette.

Previous season
They finished the season 6–25, 2–16 in Big East play to finish in last place. They advanced to the quarterfinals of the Big East women's tournament where they lost to Creighton.

Roster

Schedule

|-
!colspan=9 style=| Non-conference regular season

|-
!colspan=9 style=| Big East Conference Play

|-
!colspan=9 style=|Big East Women's Tournament

See also
2017–18 Butler Bulldogs men's basketball team

References

Butler
Butler Bulldogs women's basketball seasons
Butler Bulldogs women's basketball
Butler Bulldogs women's basketball